The Marjaree Mason Center is a non-profit, shelter-based, domestic violence program headquartered in Fresno, California.  Named for an Easton, California woman who was murdered by her ex-boyfriend, the center operates one of the largest shelters in California.

History

The Marjaree Mason Center was founded in 1979 by the YWCA-Fresno after the kidnapping, rape, and murder of Marjaree Mason.  A victim of domestic violence, Mason was killed by her ex-boyfriend, a Fresno County Sheriff's Deputy.

The center started with a group of volunteers staffing an emergency hotline for victims of domestic violence, while a few rooms at the YWCA Residence Hall became specifically designated for women and their children fleeing from domestic violence.  Over time, the services of the YWCA-Fresno increasingly focused on domestic violence and gradually discontinued most other programs until the organization focused almost exclusively on domestic violence.

In 1998, the YWCA-Fresno Board of Directors voted to end a 94-year affiliation with the National YWCA, and the Marjaree Mason Center became a stand-alone domestic violence agency.

Still headquartered in Fresno's historic Einstein Home, the home of the YWCA's old administrative offices, the center operates a variety of services from several locations in Fresno County.

Services
Most Marjaree Mason Center services are offered to victims of domestic violence and their children, though some shelter services are intended for homeless women and batterer's intervention programs are intended for domestic violence offenders.

Shelter

The Marjaree Mason Center operates three shelters in Fresno County.  These shelters mainly house women believed to be victims of domestic violence and their children. Alternative housing arrangements are also available for men who are victims of domestic violence.

Fresno Emergency and Transitional Living Safe House

The oldest of the Marjaree Mason Center shelters, the Emergency Shelter is confidentially located in the City of Fresno.  This  facility has 93 beds in 40 rooms and is staffed 24-hours a day.

The Emergency Shelter also features the Enrichment Center, where children can play, learn, and take part in activities organized by center staff.

Clovis Transitional Living Safe House

The Clovis Safe House is located in the City of Clovis.

Reedley Transitional Living Safe House

Reedley House is an 18-bed shelter, located in Reedley, California.

Hotline

The Marjaree Mason Center confidential crisis hotline (559.233.HELP) is staffed 24-hours a day, 7 days a week. Marjaree Mason Center staff can offer safety planning tips.

Therapy

Housed in the Marjaree Mason Center Administrative Offices, therapists bill on a sliding scale to treat victims of domestic violence.  The Marjaree Mason Center offers group and individual therapy for children and adults.

Advocacy

Marjaree Mason Center advocates have offices in both the Fresno Police and Fresno Sheriff's Headquarters.  They ride with domestic violence detectives to visit alleged victims and may accompany alleged victims to court.

Education

The Marjaree Mason Center offers a Legal Options class, a parenting class, and another known as S.A.F.E. Group.  Legal Options covers information on restraining orders, criminal charges, and custody questions.  The parenting class focuses on promoting positive parenting skills.  S.A.F.E. Group provides general information regarding domestic violence.  Marjaree Mason Center shelter clients are also invited to take part in life-skills, and nutrition/cooking classes. Another specific course for Safe House clients is called Expressions Through Art, which is designed to promote healing through art.

Legal Assistance

Marjaree Mason Center legal advocates assist domestic violence victims in obtaining and renewing restraining orders.  Advocates also provide court accompaniment.

Training

Three times a year, the Marjaree Mason Center offers a 40-hour domestic violence victim advocate training course that fulfills the State of California's certificate requirement for providing direct services to victims of domestic violence.

Outreach Presentations

Marjaree Mason Center outreach advocates provide informational presentations on domestic violence and domestic violence services available in Fresno County.  Presentations cover the signs of domestic violence and what to do if you believe someone you know may be a victim.  These presentations are typically performed for schools, health care providers, law enforcement officers, court officials, social service providers, and other community stakeholders who may be in a position to help victims of domestic violence.

kNOw MORE

The kNOw MORE program works within high schools and junior highs to provide teen-dating-violence prevention and intervention services to youths.  The program began as part of the Fresno County Department of Public Health, but in 2008, lack of funding forced the county to give up the project, and the Marjaree Mason Center took over administration of kNOw MORE.

kNOw MORE consists of Marjaree Mason Center staff members who train teachers to be kNOw MORE facilitators, and students to be kNOw MORE educators.  The students then travel from school to school presenting the kNOw MORE curriculum to students at large.

The kNOw MORE program operates in more than 15 Fresno County high schools and more than 10 middle schools.  The program reaches more than 15,000 Fresno County youths a year.

Batterer's Intervention

Located at a separate facility as the services for battered women, the batterer's intervention program consists of a 52-week, typically court-mandated, class for domestic violence offenders.

Statistics

Demographic Information

Of total, agency-wide clients served fiscal year 2008/2009: 
 
86% female
14% male

Demographics of clients change drastically when you compare agency-wide clients to clients served only at Marjaree Mason Center shelters.
Of all shelter clients served fiscal year 2008/2009:

77% female
23% male (boys who are children of victims)

Nearly 60% of shelter clients are children, with the vast majority being under the age of five, many being infants.

While most Marjaree Mason Center clients are younger than 34 years, the ethnicities of Marjaree Mason Center clients reflect the diversity of Fresno County, as noted on the adjacent graphs.

Marjaree Mason Center's 2010-2011 fiscal year statistics:   
948 women and children resided in MMC shelters (unduplicated clients) 
113 days transitional program average length of stay  
36 days emergency program average length of stay  
31,139 emergency nights of shelter  
12,533 transitional nights of shelter  
1,671 hotline calls   
6,237 individual/group counseling sessions  
14,319 case management/peer-counseling sessions  
1,343 victims received safety planning from victim advocates   
1,991 victims received legal advocacy assistance

See also
 Domestic violence
 National Domestic Violence Hotline

References

External links 

 Official website

Women in California
Women's shelters in the United States
Non-profit organizations based in California
Domestic violence-related organizations in the United States